Parotocinclus hardmani is a species of catfish in the family Loricariidae. It is native to South America, where it occurs in tributaries of the Potaro River, which is part of the Essequibo River basin in Guyana. It was described in February of 2022 by Pablo Lehmann A., Nathan K. Lujan, and Roberto E. Reis on the basis of its distinctive morphology. It is believed to be closely related to its congeners Parotocinclus collinsae and P. halbothi. The species reaches at least 2.43 cm (0.96 inches) in standard length. 

In July 2022, it was determined that Parotocinclus hardmani and multiple other species from the genera Parotocinclus, Curculionichthys, and Hisonotus should be classified in a different genus altogether, designated as Rhinotocinclus, although many sources do not yet follow this classification.

References 

Fish described in 2022
Otothyrinae